Youri Schoonderwaldt (born 13 March 2000) is a Dutch professional footballer who plays as a goalkeeper for Sparta Rotterdam.

Professional career
Schoonderwaldt is a youth product of VFC Vlaardingen since the age of 11, and moved to ADO Den Haag in 2017. On 11 April 2020, he signed his first professional contract with ADO Den Haag. After 3 years as reserve goalkeeper with ADO Den Haag without a senior appearance, he briefly transferred to the amateur club Quick Boys on 13 May 2022. A month later, he transferred to Sparta Rotterdam signing a 1+1 year contract. He made his professional debut with Sparta Rotterdam in a 2–1 Eredivisie win over Groningen on 17 September 2022.

References

External links
 
 

2000 births
Living people
Footballers from Amsterdam
Dutch footballers
ADO Den Haag players
Sparta Rotterdam players
Eredivisie players
Tweede Divisie players
Association football goalkeepers